Alp Yalman (born 1 January 1940) is a Turkish businessman and former chairman of the Turkish sports club Galatasaray.

Yalman was born in Istanbul. After graduating from Robert College in Turkey, he studied Social and Political Science in the University of Lausanne, Switzerland. He is fluent in English, French and German as well as his native Turkish.

In 1973, he was brought onto the board of Galatasaray. He was elected as the president in 1990, a position he held for six years. In 2002, he returned and served few more years to Galatasaray under the presidency of Özhan Canaydın.

Galatasaray S.K. won two league titles, two national cups, and two national super cups, while Alp Yalman was the president.

See also
 List of Galatasaray S.K. presidents

References
 http://www.galatasaray.org/English/Corporate/history/baskanlar.asp
 http://www.galatasaray.org/kurumsal/tarihce/baskan_kupa.asp 
 http://www.kimkimdir.gen.tr/kimkimdir.php?id=1215 

1940 births
Living people
Businesspeople from Istanbul
Galatasaray S.K. presidents
Robert College alumni
Turkish expatriates in Switzerland